Nordic Cinema Group is a Swedish company which owns 103 cinemas and 590 cinema saloons in six countries (Sweden, Norway, Finland, Estonia, Latvia and Lithuania). It was founded in 2013 through a merger of Filmstaden in Sweden, Odeon Kino in Norway, Finnkino in Finland and Forum Cinemas in the Baltics. Between 2013 and 2017, it was owned by both Bridgepoint and Bonnier Group.

In 2017, it was bought by AMC Theatres and merged into Odeon Cinemas Group. It still exists as the parent holding company for the local companies.

References

Entertainment companies established in 2013
Swedish companies established in 2013
AMC Theatres
Cinemas and movie theaters chains
Companies based in Stockholm
2017 mergers and acquisitions